Phendimetrazine (Bontril, Adipost, Anorex-SR, Appecon, Melfiat, Obezine, Phendiet, Plegine, Prelu-2, Statobex) is a stimulant drug of the morpholine chemical class used as an appetite suppressant.

Pharmacology 

Phendimetrazine functions as a prodrug to phenmetrazine; approximately 30 percent of an oral dose is converted into it. Phendimetrazine can essentially be thought of as an extended-release formulation of phenmetrazine with less potential for abuse. Phendimetrazine is an anorectic drug which acts as a norepinephrine-dopamine releasing agent (NDRA).

As an amphetamine congener, its structure incorporates the backbone of methamphetamine, a potent CNS stimulant. While the addition of an N-methyl group to  amphetamine significantly increases its potency and bioavailability, methylation of phenmetrazine renders the compound virtually inactive. However, phendimetrazine is a prodrug for phenmetrazine which acts as the active metabolite. Phendimetrazine possesses preferable pharmacokinetics over phenmetrazine as a therapeutic agent because its metabolization by demethylases produces a more steady and prolonged exposure of active drug within the body. This decreases abuse potential as the peak blood-concentration of active phenmetrazine that's produced from a single dose of phendimetrazine is lower than a single therapeutically equivalent dose of phenmetrazine. 

Indicated as a short-term secondary treatment for exogenous obesity, phendimetrazine immediate-release 35mg tablets are typically consumed one hour before meals, not to exceed three doses daily. Phendimetrazine is also manufactured as a 105mg extended-release capsule for once daily dosing, typically consumed 30 to 60 minutes before a morning meal. Whereas the immediate-release formulation has a maximum daily dosage of 210mg (6 tablets), the extended-release capsules have a maximum daily dosage of 105mg (one capsule).

Legality 

According to the List of Psychotropic Substances under International Control published by the International Narcotics Control Board, phendimetrazine is a Schedule III controlled substance under the Convention on Psychotropic Substances.

See also 

 2-Phenyl-3,6-dimethylmorpholine
 3-Fluorophenmetrazine
 Fenbutrazate
 G-130
 Morazone
 Manifaxine
 Radafaxine
 Phenmetrazine
 Fenmetramide

References 

Antiobesity drugs
Anorectics
Phenylmorpholines
Substituted amphetamines
Euphoriants
Norepinephrine-dopamine releasing agents